The  is given annually by the Directors Guild of Japan to a new director of a film released that year who is considered the most "suitable" for the award. The winner is selected by a committee formed of DGJ members. All formats—feature film, documentary, television, video, etc.—are eligible for consideration. In some years when there was no apparent winner, the Guild only issued a "citation" or did not give out the award. Multiple awards have been given in other years. With a long history, many of Japan's major postwar directors have received the award, including Nagisa Ōshima, Susumu Hani, Yoshimitsu Morita, Masayuki Suo, Takeshi Kitano, and Shunji Iwai.

Recipients
Recipients of the Directors Guild of Japan New Directors Award

References

1960 establishments in Japan
Annual events in Japan
Awards established in 1960
Japanese film awards
Recurring events established in 1960